The Richest Girl in the World can refer to:

 Doris Duke (1912–1993), a billionaire heiress who was dubbed "the richest girl in the world" during her lifetime
 The Richest Girl in the World (1934 film), a romantic comedy starring Miriam Hopkins and Joel McCrea
 The Richest Girl in the World (1958 film), a Danish film

See also
The Richest Girl, 1965 song by The Sweets